The 1964 Wimbledon Championships took place on the outdoor grass courts at the All England Lawn Tennis and Croquet Club in Wimbledon, London, United Kingdom. The tournament was held from Monday 22 June until Saturday 4 July 1964. It was the 78th staging of the Wimbledon Championships, and the third Grand Slam tennis event of 1964. Roy Emerson and Maria Bueno won the singles titles.

Champions

Seniors

Men's singles

 Roy Emerson defeated  Fred Stolle, 6–1, 12–10, 4–6, 6–3

Women's singles

 Maria Bueno defeated  Margaret Smith, 6–4, 7–9, 6–3

Men's doubles

 Bob Hewitt /  Fred Stolle defeated  Roy Emerson /  Ken Fletcher, 7–5, 11–9, 6–4

Women's doubles

 Margaret Smith /  Lesley Turner defeated  Billie Jean Moffitt /  Karen Susman, 7–5, 6–2

Mixed doubles

'Fred Stolle /  Lesley Turner defeated  Ken Fletcher /  Margaret Smith, 6–4, 6–4

Juniors

Boys' singles

 Ismail El Shafei defeated  Vladimir Korotkov, 6–2, 6–3

Girls' singles

 Peaches Bartkowicz defeated  Elena Subirats, 6–3, 6–1

References

External links
 Official Wimbledon Championships website

 
Wimbledon Championships
Wimbledon Championships
Wimbledon Championships
Wimbledon Championships